Valle Hermoso Municipality (Beautiful Valley) is one of the municipalities of Tamaulipas. The seat is at the city of Valle Hermoso. At the census of 2010 the city had a population of 48,918 inhabitants, while the municipality had a population of 63,170.  The municipality has an area of 916.43 km2. Its largest other localities are the towns of Anáhuac in the northeastern part of the municipality and El Realito to the west of the city of Valle Hermoso.

Towns and villages

The largest localities (cities, towns, and villages) are:

Adjacent municipalities

 Río Bravo Municipality - west 
 Matamoros Municipality - east

External links
Gobierno Municipal de Valle Hermoso Official website

References

Municipalities of Tamaulipas